Web most often refers to:

 Spider web, a silken structure created by the animal
 World Wide Web or the Web, an Internet-based hypertext system

Web, WEB, or the Web may also refer to:

Computing
 WEB, a literate programming system created by Donald Knuth
 GNOME Web, a Web browser
 Web.com, a web-design company
 Webs (web hosting), a Web hosting and website building service

Engineering
 Web (manufacturing), continuous sheets of material passed over rollers
 Web, a roll of paper in offset printing
 Web, the vertical element of an I-beam  or a rail profile
 Web, the interior beams of a truss

Films
 Web (2013 film), a documentary
 Webs (film), a 2003 science-fiction movie
 The Web (film), a 1947 film noir
 Charlotte's Web (2006 film)

Literature
 Web (comics), a MLJ comicbook character (created 1942)
 Web (novel), by John Wyndham (1979)
 The Web (series), a science fiction series (1997–1999)
 World English Bible, a public-domain Bible translation (2000)
 Charlotte's Web, children's novel by E. B. White (1952)

Mathematics
 Web (differential geometry), a type of set allowing an intrinsic Riemannian-geometry characterisation of the additive separation of variables in the Hamilton–Jacobi equation
 Web, a linear system of divisors of dimension 3

Music
 Web Entertainment, a record label
 Web (album), a 1995 album by Bill Laswell and Terre Thaemlitz
 "The Web", a song by Marillion from Script for a Jester's Tear
 "The Web", a song by Neurosis from Souls at Zero
 The Web (band), a British jazz/blues band active in the late 1960s and early 1970s

People 
 W. E. B. Du Bois (1868–1963), African-American sociologist, historian, civil rights activist, author and editor

Radio
 WEBS (AM), a radio station licensed to Calhoun, Georgia, United States
 West End Broadcast (WeB FM), a radio station in Newcastle, England, that was a forerunner of NE1fm

Television
 The Web (1950 TV series), a 1950–1954 American mystery/suspense anthology television series that was broadcast on CBS
 The Web (1957 TV series), an American mystery/suspense anthology television series, similar to the 1950–1954 series, that aired on NBC in 1957 as a summer replacement series
 W.E.B., a 1978 American TV series
 The Web, a fictional region of space in the ReBoot television series (and game)
 "Web", an episode of season 7 of Law & Order: Special Victims Unit
 "The Web", an episode of Blake's 7

Other uses
 West-East Bag, an international women artists network active from 1971 to 1973

See also

 Cobweb (disambiguation)
 Spider Web (disambiguation)
 Webb (disambiguation)
 Webbing, a strong woven fabric
 Interdigital webbing, the presence of membranes of skin between the digits
 Webbed toes
 Webbed, a 2021 video game
 Webby (disambiguation)
 WWW (disambiguation)